The Man Who Knew Too Much is a 1934 British film noir political thriller film directed by Alfred Hitchcock, featuring Leslie Banks and Peter Lorre, and released by Gaumont British. It was one of the most successful and critically acclaimed films of Hitchcock's British period.

The film is Hitchcock's first film using this title and was followed later with his own 1956 film using the same name featuring a significantly different plot and script with some modifications. The second film featured James Stewart and Doris Day, and was made for Paramount Pictures. The two films are very similar in tone. In the book-length interview Hitchcock/Truffaut (1967), in response to filmmaker François Truffaut's assertion that aspects of the remake were by far superior, Hitchcock replied, "Let's say the first version is the work of a talented amateur and the second was made by a professional." However, it has been said this statement cannot be taken at face value.

The 1934 film has nothing except the title in common with G. K. Chesterton's 1922 book of the same name. Hitchcock decided to use the title because he held the film rights for some of the stories in the book.

Synopsis
Bob and Jill Lawrence, a British couple on a trip to Switzerland with their daughter Betty, befriend Frenchman Louis Bernard, who is staying at their hotel. Jill is participating in a clay pigeon shooting contest. She reaches the final but loses to a male sharpshooter, Ramon Levine, because at the crucial moment she is distracted by a chiming watch belonging to a Mr. Abbott.

That evening, Louis is shot as Jill dances with him. Before he dies, he tells Jill where to find a note intended for the British consul; she in turn tells Bob. Bob reads the note, which warns of a planned international crime.
The criminals involved in the shooting kidnap Betty, and threaten to kill her if her parents tell anyone what they know. Unable to seek help from the police, Bob and Jill return to England, where they discover that the group, led by Abbott, have hired Ramon to shoot a European head of state during a concert at the Royal Albert Hall. Jill attends the concert and throws Ramon's aim off by screaming at the crucial moment.

The criminals return to their lair behind the temple of a sun-worshipping cult. Bob had entered the temple searching for Betty, and both are being held prisoner in the adjoining house. The police surround the building and a gunfight ensues. The criminals hold out until their ammunition runs low and most of them have been killed.

Betty climbs up to the roof, fleeing from Ramon, who follows her. A police marksman dares not shoot at him because Betty is so close. Jill grabs the rifle and shoots Ramon, who falls off the roof.
The police storm the building. Abbott, the criminal mastermind, is hiding inside but he is betrayed by the chiming of his watch. He shoots himself (as shown by the gunshot smoke) and dies. Betty is reunited with her parents.

Cast

 Leslie Banks as Bob Lawrence
 Edna Best as Jill Lawrence
 Peter Lorre as Abbott
 Frank Vosper as Ramon Levine
 Hugh Wakefield as Clive
 Nova Pilbeam as Betty Lawrence
 Pierre Fresnay as Louis Bernard
 Cicely Oates as Nurse Agnes
 D. A. Clarke-Smith as Binstead
 George Curzon as Gibson

Production
Before switching to the project, Hitchcock was reported to be working on Road House (1934), which was eventually directed by Maurice Elvey. The film started when Hitchcock and writer Charles Bennett tried to adapt a Bulldog Drummond story revolving around international conspiracies and the kidnapping of a baby; its original title was Bulldog Drummond's Baby. The deal for an adaptation fell through, and the frame of the plot was reused in the script for The Man Who Knew Too Much, the title itself taken from an unrelated G.K. Chesterton compilation.

The story is credited to Bennett and D. B. Wyndham Lewis. Bennett claimed that Lewis had been hired to write some dialogue that was never used and provided none of the story, though this account has been disputed.

It was Peter Lorre's second English-language film, following the multiple-language version of M (1931). But he was still unable to speak English, having only recently fled Nazi Germany, and learned his lines phonetically.

The shoot-out at the end of the film was based on the Sidney Street Siege, a real-life incident that took place in London's East End (where Hitchcock grew up) on 3 January 1911. The shoot-out was not included in Hitchcock's 1956 remake.

Hitchcock hired Australian composer Arthur Benjamin to write a piece of music especially for the set piece at the Royal Albert Hall. The music, known as the Storm Clouds Cantata, is used in both the 1934 version and the 1956 remake.

Alfred Hitchcock's cameo appears 33 minutes into the film. He can be seen crossing the street from right to left in a black trenchcoat before Bob and Clive enter the chapel.

Reception
Contemporary reviews were positive, with C.A. Lejeune of The Observer stating that he was "happy about this film [...] because of its very recklessness, its frank refusal to indulge in subtleties, to be the most promising work that Hitchcock has produced since Blackmail". The Daily Telegraph referred to it as a "striking come-back" for Hitchcock, while the Daily Mail stated that "Hitchcock leaps once again into the front rank of British directors." The New York Times praised the film as the "raciest melodrama of the new year", noting that it was "excitingly written" and an "excellently performed bit of story-telling". The review praised Hitchcock as "one of England's ablest and most imaginative film makers" and stated that Lorre "lacks the opportunity to be the one-man chamber of horrors that he was in [M]" but "is certainly something to be seen," comparing him favourably to actor Charles Laughton.

The film has an approval rating of 88% on Rotten Tomatoes based on 32 reviews, with an average rating of 7.76/10.

Bans
The film was banned in Norway in January 1935 without citing any reason other than issuing the following statement: The film above is not approved for public viewing in Norway.

Copyright and home media status
The Man Who Knew Too Much, like all of Hitchcock's British films, is copyrighted worldwide but has been heavily bootlegged on home video. Despite this, various licensed, restored releases have appeared on DVD, Blu-ray and video on demand services from Network Distributing in the UK, Criterion in the US and many others.

References

Notes

Sources

 Ryall, Tom. Alfred Hitchcock and the British Cinema. Athlone Press, 1996.

External links

Alfred Hitchcock Collectors’ Guide: The Man Who Knew Too Much at Brenton Film

1934 films
1930s psychological thriller films
1930s spy thriller films
1930s mystery thriller films
British black-and-white films
British mystery thriller films
British spy thriller films
British psychological thriller films
Films about assassinations
Films about child abduction
Films about vacationing
Films directed by Alfred Hitchcock
Films set in London
Films set in Switzerland
Films shot at Lime Grove Studios
1930s English-language films
1930s British films
Film censorship in Norway